Camp Courage is a summer camp for children and adults with disabilities located in Maple Lake, Minnesota. A closely affiliated camp, Camp Courage North, is located near Bemidji, Minnesota. Until November 19, 2012, both camps were owned and operated by Courage Center, a disability advocacy organization.

Camp Courage

Camp Courage is located on a  property near Maple Lake. It consists of two campuses, the Lakeside Campus and the Woodland Campus. The Lakeside Campus caters to individuals with physical disabilities and visual impairments, while the Woodland Campus caters to children with speech, hearing, and language impairments.

Camp Courage North

Camp Courage North is located on a  property on the shore of Lake George, Minnesota, near Itasca State Park and Bemidji. It offers sessions for teens and adults with a wide range of disabilities.

See also
Courage Center
Courage Centers of Minnesota Homepage

References

Courage Minnesota
Courage
Buildings and structures in Wright County, Minnesota